Piru may refer to:

Towns and Villages 
Piru, Bihar, a village in Aurangabad district, Bihar, India
Piru, Indonesia, a village on the west coast of Seram Island
Piru, Iran, a village in Kerman Province
Piru, California, a small town in Ventura County in the United States 
Piru Mansion, also known as Newhall Mansion, a mansion located in the city.
Piru Creek, a creek in California
Lake Piru, a lake in California 
Piru Nou, a Romanian city in the Pir, Satu Mare commune 
Piru Bay, (or Teluk Piru), a bay in Indonesia

People and Groups
Pirus, a street gang
Piru Singh (1918-1948), Indian army non-commissioned officer 
Piru Gaínza (or Agustin Gaínza) (1922-1995), Spanish footballer
Piru Sáez, Argentine actor and singer
Alexandru Piru, Romanian historian and critic

Other
Piru Bay languages, a group of Malayo-Polynesian languages spoken around Indonesia
Piru language, an Indonesian language primarily spoken on the island of Seram 
Piru (spirit), an evil spirit or demon in Finnish mythology

See also
Puru (disambiguation)
Piri (disambiguation)